Gornate-Olona (Gornà in the local dialect of Lombard language) is a comune (municipality) in the Province of Varese in the Italian region Lombardy, located about  northwest of Milan and about  southeast of Varese.

Gornate-Olona borders the following municipalities: Carnago, Caronno Varesino, Castelseprio, Castiglione Olona, Lonate Ceppino, Morazzone, Venegono Inferiore.

Demographic evolution

References

Cities and towns in Lombardy